Langley High School may refer to:

Langley High School (Fairfax County, Virginia), United States
Langley High School, Oldbury, West Midlands, England
Langley High School (Pittsburgh), Pennsylvania, United States

See also
Langley School (disambiguation)
Cardinal Langley Roman Catholic High School, Middleton, Greater Manchester, England